The Gareau was a Canadian automobile manufactured only in 1910.  Only three 35 hp worm-drive fours were completed before the firm, based in Montreal, folded for lack of working capital. The models were named "La Nationale," "La Marmon," and "La KisselKar."

References

Defunct motor vehicle manufacturers of Canada
History of Montreal